Dzikie Pola or Dikoe Pole - Дикое Поле (wild plain) can refer to:

 Zaporizhia (region), a historical region of modern Ukraine
 Wild Field (wilderness reserve), in Russian  (Dikoe pole), a wilderness reserve in Tula Oblast in the European part of Russia
 Dzikie Pola (role-playing game), a Polish role-playing game, set in the 17th century Polish-Lithuanian Commonwealth

pl:Dzikie Pola